West of Suez, released in the United States as The Fighting Wildcats, is a 1957 British drama film directed by Arthur Crabtree and starring Keefe Brasselle, Kay Callard and Karel Stepanek.

Premise
An adventurer is hired to assassinate the leader of an Arab movement advocating peace, but is unable to complete his mission.

Cast
 Keefe Brasselle as Brett Manders
 Kay Callard as Pat
 Karel Stepanek as Langford
 Ursula Howells as Eileen
 Bruce Seton as Major Osborne
 Richard Shaw as Cross
 Harry Fowler as Tommy
 Sheldon Lawrence as Jeff
 Alex Gallier as Ibrahim Sayed
 Maya Koumani as Men Hassa

Production
Braselle was meant to direct as well as star but could not get a permit to do so from the British trade union, so producer Richard Gordon had to replace him with Arthur Crabtree.

Critical reception
TV Guide called it an "okay suspense story with a dull romantic subplot."

References

External links

1957 films
1957 drama films
Films directed by Arthur Crabtree
British drama films
Films with screenplays by Norman Hudis
1950s English-language films
1950s British films